Alex Chan Kai-chung is the former leader of the Citizens Party of Hong Kong.

References

Leaders of political parties
Living people
Year of birth missing (living people)
Place of birth missing (living people)
Citizens Party (Hong Kong) politicians